The history of the Jews in India dates back to antiquity. Judaism was one of the first foreign religions to arrive in India in recorded history. Indian Jews are a small religious minority who have lived in India since ancient times. They have experienced very sparse instances of anti-Semitism from the local non-Jewish majority. 

The better-established ancient Jewish communities have assimilated many of the local traditions through cultural diffusion. While some Indian Jews have stated that their ancestors arrived during the time of the Biblical Kingdom of Judah, others claim descent from the Ten Lost Tribes of the pre-Judaic Israelites who arrived in India earlier. Still some other Indian Jews contend that they descend from the Israelite Tribe of Manasseh and they are referred to as the Bnei Menashe. 

The Jewish population in British India peaked at around 20,000 in the mid-1940s, according to some estimates, with others putting the number as high as 50,000, but the community declined rapidly due to emigration to the newly formed Israel after the Partition of Palestine at the end of the British Mandate in 1948. The Indian Jewish community is now estimated to number no more than 5,000 people.

Jewish groups in India

In addition to Jewish expatriates and recent immigrants, there are seven Jewish groups in India: 
The Malabar component of the Cochin Jews, according to Shalva Weil, claim to have arrived in India together with the Hebrew King Solomon's merchants. The Cochin Jews settled in Kerala as traders. The fair-complexioned component is of European-Jewish descent, both Ashkenazi and Sephardi.
 Chennai Jews: The Spanish and Portuguese Jews, Paradesi Jews and British Jews arrived at Madras during the 16th century. They were diamond businesspeople and of Sephardi and Ashkenazi heritage. Following expulsion from Iberia in 1492 by the Alhambra Decree, a few families of Sephardic Jews eventually made their way to Madras in the 16th century. They maintained trade connections to Europe, and their language skills were useful. Although the Sephardim mostly spoke Ladino (i.e. Spanish or Judeo-Spanish), in India they learned Tamil and Judeo-Malayalam from the Malabar Jewish.
 Nagercoil Jews: The Syrian Jews, Musta'arabi Jews were Arab Jews who arrived at Nagercoil and Kanyakumari District in 52 AD along with the arrival of St. Thomas. Most of them were merchants and had also settled around the town of Thiruvithamcode. By the turn of the 20th century, most of the families made their way to Cochin and eventually migrated to Israel. In their early days, they maintained trade connections to Europe through the nearby ports of Colachal and Thengaipattinam, and their language skills were useful to the Travancore Kings. As historians Rev. Daniel Tyerman and George Bennett cited, the reason for the Jews selecting Nagercoil as their settlement was the town’s salubrious climate and its significant Christian population.
 The Jews of Goa: These were Sephardic Jews from Spain and Portugal who fled to Goa after the commencement of the Inquisition in those countries. The community consisted mainly of Jews who had falsely converted to Christianity but wanted to continue taking advantage of being Portuguese subjects, instead of emigrating to countries where they could practice Judaism openly (e.g. Morocco, Ottoman Empire). They were the primary targets of the Goa Inquisition. As a result, its members fled to parts of India that were not under Portuguese control.
 Another branch of the Bene Israel community resided in Karachi until the Partition of India in 1947, when they fled to India (in particular, to Mumbai). Many of them also moved to Israel. The Jews from the Sindh, Punjab and Pathan areas are often incorrectly called Bani Israel Jews. The Jewish community who used to reside in other parts of what became Pakistan (such as Lahore or Peshawar) also fled to India in 1947, in a similar manner to the larger Karachi Jewish community.
The Baghdadi Jews arrived in the city of Surat from Iraq (and other Arab states), Iran and Afghanistan about 250 years ago, in the mid 18th and 19th centuries.
The Bnei Menashe meaning "Sons of Manassah" in Hebrew, are Mizo and Kuki tribesmen in Manipur and Mizoram who are recent converts to the modern form of Judaism, but claim ancestry reaching back to one of the lost ten tribes of Israel; specifically, one of the sons of Joseph. 
Similarly, the small Telugu speaking group, the Bene Ephraim (meaning "Sons of Ephraim" in Hebrew) also claim ancestry from Ephraim, one of the sons of Joseph and a lost tribe of ancient Israel. Also called "Telugu Jews", their observance of modern Judaism dates to 1981.
European Jewish immigrants to India escaping persecution during World War II account for a small portion of Jewish Indians today. From 1938-1947, about 2,000 Jews fled from Europe and sought asylum in India. Over seventy years later, the descendants of these Jewish migrants have made their own Jewish-Indian mixed community and culture within India.

Cochin Jews 

The oldest of the Indian Jewish communities was in the erstwhile Cochin Kingdom. The traditional account is that traders of Judea arrived at Cranganore, an ancient port near Cochin in 562 BC, and that more Jews came as exiles from Israel in the year 70 AD, after the destruction of the Second Temple. Many of these Jews' ancestors passed on the account that they settled in India when the Hebrew King Solomon was in power. This was a time that teak wood, ivory, spices, monkeys, and peacocks were popular in trade in Cochin. There is no specific date or reason mentioned as to why they arrived in India, but Hebrew scholars date it to up to around the early Middle Ages. Cochin is a group of small tropical islands filled with markets and many different cultures such as Dutch, Hindu, Jewish, Portuguese, and British. The distinct Jewish community was called Anjuvannam. The still-functioning synagogue in Mattancherry belongs to the Paradesi Jews, the descendants of Sephardim that were expelled from Spain in 1492, although the Jewish community in Mattancherry adjacent to Fort Cochin had only six remaining members as of 2015.

Central to the history of the Cochin Jews is their close relationship with Indian rulers, and this was eventually codified on a set of copper plates granting the community special privileges. The date of these plates, known as "Sâsanam", is contentious. The plates themselves provide a date of 379 CE, but in 1925, tradition was setting it as 1069 CE, Joseph Rabban by Bhaskara Ravi Varma, the fourth ruler of Maliban granted the copper plates to the Jews. The plates were inscribed with a message stating that the village of Anjuvannam belonged to the Jews and that they were the rightful lords of Anjuvannam and it should remain theirs and be passed on to their Jewish descendants "so long as the world and moon exist". This is the earliest document that shows that the Jews were living in India permanently. It is stored in Cochins main synagogue. The Jews settled in Kodungallur (Cranganore) on the Malabar Coast, where they traded peacefully, until 1524. The Jewish leader Rabban was granted the rank of prince over the Jews of Cochin, given the rulership and tax revenue of a pocket principality in Anjuvannam, near Cranganore, and rights to seventy-two "free houses". The Hindu king gave permission in perpetuity (or, in the more poetic expression of those days, "as long as the world and moon exist") for Jews to live freely, build synagogues, and own property "without conditions attached". A link back to Rabban, "the king of Shingly" (another name for Cranganore), was a sign of both purity and prestige. Rabban's descendants maintained this distinct community until a chieftainship dispute broke out between two brothers, one of them named Joseph Azar, in the 16th century. The Jews lived peacefully for over a thousand years in Anjuvannam. After the reign of the Rabban's, the Jewish people no longer had the protection of the copper plates. Neighboring princes of Anjuvannam intervened and revoked all privileges that the Jewish people were given. In 1524, the Jews were attacked by the Moors brothers (Muslim Community) on a suspicion that they were tampering with the pepper trade and the homes and synagogues belonging to them were destroyed. The damage was so extensive that when the Portuguese arrived a few years later, only a small amount of impoverished Jews remained. They remained there for 40 more years only to return to their land of Cochin. Today it also attracts tourists as a historic site. Cochin synagogue at Ernakulum operates partly as a shop by one of few remaining Cochin Jews. It is recorded that currently only 26 Jews lives in Kerala, who is located in different parts of Kerala such as Cochin, Kottayam and Thiruvalla. John Jacob is one of the Kerala most senior Jews, who currently lives in Kaviyoor village, Thiruvalla, Pathanamthitta District. 

In Mala, Thrissur District, the Malabar Jews have a Synagogue and a cemetery, as well as in Chennamangalam, Parur and Ernakulam. There are at least seven existing synagogues in Kerala, although not serving their original purpose anymore.

Madras Jews 

Jews also settled in Madras (now Chennai) soon after its founding in 1640. Most of them were coral merchants from Leghorn, the Caribbean, London, and Amsterdam who were of Portuguese origin and belonged to the Henriques De Castro, Franco, Paiva or Porto families.

Jacques (Jaime) de Paiva (Pavia), originally from Amsterdam belonging to Amsterdam Sephardic community, was an early Jewish arrival and the leader of Madras Jewish community. He built the Second Madras Synagogue and Jewish Cemetery Chennai in Peddanaickenpet, which later became the South end of Mint Street. 

Jacques (Jaime) de Paiva (Pavia) established good relations with those in power and bought several Golconda diamonds mines to source Golconda diamonds. Through his efforts, Jews were permitted to live within Fort St. George.

De Paiva died in 1687 after a visit to his mines and was buried in the Jewish cemetery he had established in Peddanaickenpet, which later became the north Mint Street. In 1670, the Portuguese population in Madras numbered around 3000. Before his death he established "The Colony of Jewish Traders of Madraspatam" with Antonio do Porto, Pedro Pereira and Fernando Mendes Henriques. This enabled more Portuguese Jews, from Leghorn, the Caribbean, London and Amsterdam, to settle in Madras. Coral Merchant Street was named after the Jews' business.

Three Portuguese Jews were nominated to be aldermen of Madras Corporation. Three - Bartolomeo Rodrigues, Domingo do Porto and Alvaro da Fonseca - also founded the largest trading house in Madras. The large tomb of Rodrigues, who died in Madras in 1692, became a landmark in Peddanaickenpet, but was later destroyed.

Samuel de Castro came to Madras from Curaçao and Salomon Franco came from Leghorn.

In 1688, there were three Jewish representatives in the Madras Corporation. Most Jewish settlers resided in the Coral Merchants Street in Muthialpet. They also had a cemetery, called Jewish Cemetery Chennai in the neighbouring Peddanaickenpet.

Bene Israel 

Foreign notices of the Bene Israel go back at least to 1768, when Rahabi Ezekiel wrote to a Dutch trading partner that they were widespread in Maharatta Province, and observed two Jewish observances, recital of the Shema and observation of Shabbat rest. They claim that they descend from 14 Jewish men and women, equally divided by gender, who survived the shipwreck of refugees from persecution or political turmoil, and came ashore at Navagaon near Alibag, 20 miles south of Mumbai, some 17 to 19 centuries ago. They were instructed in the rudiments of normative Judaism by Cochin Jews. Their Jewishness is controversial, and initially was not accepted by the Rabbinate in Israel. Since 1964 however they intermarried throughout Israel and are now considered Israeli and Jewish in all respects.

They are divided into sub-castes which do not intermarry: the dark-skinned "Kala" and fair-skinned "Gora." The latter are believed to be lineal descendants of the shipwreck survivors, while the former are considered to descend from concubinage of a male with local women. They were nicknamed the shanivār telī ("Saturday oil-pressers") by the local population as they abstained from work on Saturdays. Bene Israel communities and synagogues are situated in Pen, Mumbai, Alibag, Pune and Ahmedabad with smaller communities scattered around India. The largest synagogue in Asia outside Israel is in Pune (Ohel David Synagogue).

Mumbai had a thriving Bene Israel community until the 1950s to 1960s when many families from the community emigrated to the fledgling state of Israel, where they are known as Hodi'im (Indians).
The Bene Israel community has risen to many positions of prominence in Israel. In India itself the Bene Israel community has shrunk considerably with many of the old Synagogues falling into disuse.

Unlike many parts of the world, Jews have historically lived in India with relatively little serious anti-Semitism from the local majority populace, the Hindus. However, Jews were persecuted by the Portuguese during their control of Goa.

Bombay/Mumbai

South Asian Jews and Baghdadi Jews 

The first known Baghdadi Jewish immigrant to India, Joseph Semah, arrived in the port city of Surat in 1730. He and other early immigrants established a synagogue and cemetery in Surat, though most of the city's Jewish community eventually moved to Bombay (Mumbai), where they established a new synagogue and cemetery. They were traders and quickly became one of the most prosperous communities in the city. As philanthropists, some donated their wealth for public building projects. The Sassoon Docks and David Sassoon Library are some of the famous landmarks still standing today.

The synagogue in Surat was eventually razed; the cemetery, though in poor condition, can still be seen on the Katargam-Amroli road. One of the graves within is that of Moseh Tobi, buried in 1769, who was described as 'ha-Nasi ha-Zaken' (The Elder Prince) by David Solomon Sassoon in his book A History of the Jews in Baghdad (Simon Wallenburg Press, 2006).

Baghdadi Jewish populations spread beyond Bombay to other parts of India, with an important community forming in Calcutta (Kolkata). Scions of this community did well in trade (particularly jute and tea), and in later years contributed officers to the army. One, Lt-Gen J. F. R. Jacob PVSM, became state governor of Goa (1998–1999), then Punjab, and later served as administrator of Chandigarh. Pramila (Esther Victoria Abraham) became the first ever Miss India, in 1947.

Bnei Menashe 

The Bnei Menashe are a group of more than 9,000 people from the northeastern Indian states of Mizoram and Manipur who practice a form of biblical Judaism and claim descent from one of the Lost Tribes of Israel. They were originally headhunters and animists, and converted to Christianity at the beginning of the 20th century, but began converting to Judaism in the 1970s.

Bene Ephraim 

The Bene Ephraim are a small group of Telugu-speaking Jews in eastern Andhra Pradesh whose recorded observance of Judaism, like that of the Bnei Menashe, is quite recent, dating only to 1991.

There are a few families in Andhra Pradesh who follow Judaism. Many among them follow the customs of Orthodox Jews, like wearing long beards by men and using head coverings (men) and hair coverings (women) all the time.

Delhi Jewry 

Judaism in Delhi is primarily focused on the expatriate community who work in Delhi, as well as Israeli diplomats and a small local community. In Paharganj, Chabad has set up a synagogue and religious center in a backpacker area regularly visited by Israeli tourists.

Holocaust Refugees 
Between 1938 and 1947, roughly 2,000 Jews immigrated from Europe to British India to escape persecution by the Nazi regime. Most of these refugees arrived in India leading into the start of World War II and consequently were better positioned to find employment and shelter than many European Jews who were forced to leave in the midst of war. Jewish refugees in British India were able to secure jobs in the arts and the service industry while a disproportionately large percentage of the migrants found employment in the medical field. Alongside the adoption of various Indian societal practices and customs, these jobs helped Jewish immigrants create a sense of their unique cultural place and identity as Jews within British India. 

Immigration policy within the British Empire in the late 1930s and early 1940s often complicated Jewish entry into British India. One requirement of wartime migrants entering British India was for their passports to be "valid for return," where British officials could repatriate refugees if they were deemed burdensome. The annexation of Austria in 1938 saw the replacement of Austrian passports with German documents, meaning that Austrian Jews attempting to flee with Austrian passports no longer met British immigration requirements. Still, Jewish aid organizations in India (most prominently the Council for German Jewry and the Jewish Relief Association) helped to form policies that benefited Jewish immigrants and regulated how Jews were resettled in India.

Since most Jewish refugees spoke German and originated from Germany or its neighboring countries, British officials and Indian locals often found the migrants indistinguishable from their non-Jewish counterparts. By 1940, many Jewish refugees were suspected of being Nazi sympathizers or agents passing as Jewish.

Today

The majority of Indian Jews have "made Aliyah" (migrated) to Israel since the creation of the modern state in 1948. Over 70,000 Indian Jews now live in Israel (over 1% of Israel's total population). Of the remaining 5,000, the largest community is concentrated in Mumbai, where 3,500 have stayed over from the over 30,000 Jews registered there in the 1940s, divided into Bene Israel and Baghdadi Jews, though the Baghdadi Jews refused to recognize the B'nei Israel as Jews, and withheld dispensing charity to them for that reason. There are reminders of Jewish localities in Kerala still left such as synagogues. The majority of Jews from the old British-Indian capital of Calcutta (Kolkata) have also migrated to Israel over the last six decades.

Notable Jews of Indian descent 

 Joseph Rabban, the first Israeli king of Shingly was given copper plates of special grants from the Chera ruler Bhaskara Ravivarman II from Kerala
 Amrita Sher-Gil (1913-1941), Hungarian-Indian painter
 Ezekiel Rahabi (1694–1771), chief Jewish merchant of the Dutch East India Company in Cochin (Kochi) for almost 50 years
 Abraham Barak Salem (1882–1967), Cochin Jewish Indian nationalist leader
 Aditya Roy Kapur (1985-), Indian actor
 Eli Ben-Menachem (1947- ), Israeli politician
 Jacqueline Bhabha (1951- ), lecturer at Harvard Law School and Harvard Kennedy School of Government
 Ranjit Chaudhry (1955–2020), Bollywood actor
 Anil Melwin Machado, Yoga & Kalaripayyattu Master.
 David Abraham Cheulkar (1908-1982), Bollywood actor
 Isaac David Kehimkar (1957- ), lepidopterist, butterfly expert based in Navi Mumbai. 
 Reuben David (1912-1989) zoologist
 Esther David (March 17, 1945— ), Jewish-Indian author, an artist and a sculptor
 Nadira (1932–2006), Bollywood actress
 Karen David (1979- ), British-Canadian actress
 Dr Abraham Erulkar, personal physician to Mahatma Gandhi, father of Lila Erulkar
 Lila Erulkar, First Lady of Cyprus (1993–2003) and wife of Glafcos Clerides, president of the Republic of Cyprus 
 Nissim Ezekiel, poet, playwright, editor and art-critic
 Lieutenant General J F R Jacob, former Chief of Staff of the Indian Army's Eastern Command, and former Governor of Punjab and Goa
 Vice Admiral Benjamin Abraham Samson, Indian Navy Admiral, former Flag Officer Commanding Indian Fleet
 (Hakham) Ezra Reuben David Barook, a High Priest in Jerusalem in 1856. He travelled to India and settled in Calcutta
 Gerry Judah, artist and designer
 Ellis Kadoorie and Elly Kadoorie, philanthropists
 Horace Kadoorie, philanthropist
 Lillian, Indian film actress
 Samson Kehimkar, musician
 Ezekiel Isaac Malekar, Bene Israel rabbi
 Ruby Myers, Bollywood actress of the 1920s known as Sulochana
 Firoza Begum, Indian actress born as 'Erin Daniels'
 Pearl Padamsee, theatre personality
 David and Simon Reuben, businessmen
 Lalchanhima Sailo, rabbi and founder of Chhinlung Israel People's Convention
 David Sassoon, businessman
 Albert Abdullah David Sassoon, British Indian merchant
 Sassoon David Sassoon, philanthropist and benefactor of greater Indian Jewish community
 Solomon Sopher, Jewish community leader in Mumbai
 Esther Victoria Abraham, also known as Pramila, first Miss India
 Fleur Ezekiel - Bene Israel model, chosen as Miss India World in 1959
 Sheila Singh Paul, paediatrician, founder and director of Kalawati Saran Children's Hospital, New Delhi; pioneer in polio vaccination
 Ruby Daniel, Israeli author of Cochin Jewish origin
 Leela Samson, dancer, choreographer, and actress
 Jael Silliman, Baghdadi Indian Jewish author based in Kolkata
 Anish Kapoor, Jewish Artist of Indian Descent
 Bensiyon Songavkar, Indian cricket, silver medalist at the 2009 Maccabiah Games

See also

 Bene Ephraim
 Bnei Menashe
 Cochin Jews
 Desi Jews
 Meshuchrarim
 Paradesi Jews
 Sephardic Jews in India
 Christianity in India
History of the Jews in Afghanistan
History of the Jews in Tajikistan
History of the Jews in Pakistan
History of the Jews in Sri Lanka

Notes

References

Further reading
 Aafreedi, Navras Jaat, ed., Café Dissensus, Issue 12: Indian Jewry, January 2015
 Aafreedi, Navras Jaat, "Community and Belonging in Indian Jewish Literature", Himal Southasian, May 2014
 Aafreedi, Navras Jaat, "Absence of Jewish Studies in India: Creating A New Awareness", Asian Jewish Life, Autumn 2010, pp. 31–34.
 Aafreedi, Navras Jaat, "Jewish-Muslim Relations in South Asia: Where Antipathy lives without Jews", Asian Jewish Life, Issue 15, October 2014, pp. 13–16.
 Aafreedi, Navras Jaat, "The Attitudes of Lucknow's Muslims towards Jews, Israel and Zionism", Café Dissensus, Issue 7, April 15, 2014
 Aafreedi, Navras Jaat, "History of India's Jewish Beauty Queens", Yedioth Ahronoth, August 3, 2013
 Aafreedi, Navras Jaat, "Hindi Novel Portrays Life of Indian Jews", Yedioth Ahronoth, May 23, 2013
 India's Bene Israel: A Comprehensive Inquiry and Sourcebook Isenberg, Shirley Berry; Berkeley: Judah L. Magnes Museum, 1988
 Indian Jewish Heritage: Ritual, Art and Life-Cycle Dr. Shalva Weil (ed). Mumbai: Marg Publications, 3rd ed. 2009
 Indo-Judaic Studies in the Twenty-First Century: A Perspective from the Margin, Katz N., Chakravarti, R., Sinha, B. M. and Weil, S., New York and Basingstoke, England: Palgrave Macmillan. 2007
 Karmic Passages: Israeli Scholarship on India, Shulman, D. and Weil, S. New Delhi: Oxford University Press.2008
 The Last Jews of Kerala, Edna Fernandes, Portobello Books,, 2008.

External links 

 Jews Of India Encyclopedia of India article in Encyclopedia.com
 TheJewsOfIndia.com Comprehensive website of Jews in India
 Bneimenashe.com, Bnei Menashe Jews of North East India
 Haruth.com Jewish India
 Jewsofindia.org Jews of India
 Indjews.com, Indian synagogues in Israel
 Indian Jews - Jewish Encyclopedia
 Bene Israel - Jewish Encyclopedia
 Cochin Jews - Jewish Encyclopedia
 Calcutta Jews - Jewish Encyclopedia
 India Virtual Jewish History Tour - Jewish Virtual Library
 Information on synagogues in Kerala, India